Against All Odds is a collaborative studio album by American rappers Young Noble and E.D.I., It was released on March 7, 2006. In addition to the regular album, a "clean" version, with profanity removed, was also released.

Track listing

References

External links 
 OutlawzMedia.net Official Website

2006 albums
Outlawz albums
Young Noble albums
E.D.I. albums
Real Talk Entertainment albums
Albums produced by Big Hollis
Collaborative albums
Gangsta rap albums by American artists